Eliana Rubashkyn (born 25 June 1988) is a New Zealand pharmacist and chemist, known for being the first intersex person assigned male at birth legally recognised as a woman with a UN mechanism under the international refugee statute. Born in Colombia, Rubashkyn was formerly stateless. She currently works as a programme officer at ILGA world, and as a harm reduction scientist developing human right campaigns of support addressed to LGBTI asylum seekers, refugees and intersex persons around the world.

Rubashkyn's gender was recognised under the United Nations' 1951 Convention relating to the Status of Refugees. Rubashkyn's case attracted international media and legal attention after her mistreatment following her detention at Hong Kong International Airport because of the lack of congruence between her gender identity and her passport photo, resulting in several years of statelessness in Hong Kong, and inhumane reclusion into several refuge centers across Yuen Long.

Personal life
Rubashkyn was born in Colombia to a Ukrainian Jewish mother who had moved there in the 1970s. She was assigned male at birth, but was born with an intersex condition known as Partial Androgen Insensitivity Syndrome.

In 2011, Rubashkyn obtained her degree in pharmacy and chemistry at the National University of Colombia. After studying molecular biology in the University of Granada, she was granted a scholarship to develop postgraduate studies in public health at the Taipei Medical University, and at the same time started her gender transition in Taiwan.

Within a year, hormone replacement therapy changed Rubashkyn's physical appearance dramatically due to her intersex condition, and the Taiwanese immigration authorities required her to update her passport at the closest Colombian consulate before she could begin her second year of master's studies. She travelled to Hong Kong to do so, but when she arrived at Hong Kong International Airport's immigration facility, she was detained for over eight months in several detention and refugee centres because of her ambiguous legal condition. She suffered from abusive mistreatment and constant sexual abuse and harassment in several of the reclusion centres in which she lived.

She was also restrained in a psychiatric ward of the Queen Elizabeth Hospital in Kowloon, caused by an attempted suicide, after being mistreated and sexually abused.

Unable to seek asylum to be granted protection as a refugee in Hong Kong due to the government not having ratified the UN Refugee Convention, she faced deportation, and suffered severe mistreatment in the airport's detention centre.

Rubashkyn currently lives in Auckland, New Zealand, where she was eventually granted asylum as a refugee.

Rubashkyn learned many languages fluently in the refugee centers in which she lived during 2012, 2013 and 2014.

She remained stateless until 3 April 2018, when she was granted New Zealand citizenship based on her exceptional circumstances.

Statelessness

In 2013, the UN sought another country to resettle Rubashkyn because of the lack of protections for LGBTI people and refugees in Hong Kong. Rubashkyn refused to contact her home embassy to prevent deportation because of the lack of diplomatic assistance they offered, and she became de facto stateless on 30 October 2012. Rubashkyn's position as a refugee limited the contact she could have with authorities from the governments of Colombia.

Marriage

On 2 June 2015, Rubashkyn married a Yemenite Jewish man named Itamar in New Zealand. The NZ Registrar of Marriages caused some controversy in relation to the solemnisation of their marriage when, in addition to Rubashkyn's present legal name, they asked for her dead name to register the marriage.

International response 

With the help of Amnesty International and the United Nations High Commissioner for Refugees (UNHCR), she was granted refugee status. However, because Hong Kong is not a signatory of the 1951 refugee convention, it did not recognise her as a refugee and sought to deport her to Colombia.

Her case drew international attention, particularly in Southeast Asia and Colombia, where transgender, gender diverse people and intersex people are often persecuted. Her case was also noted in New Zealand, a country known for its stance on equality for LGBTI people.

On 16 December 2013, the UN offered a solution by recognising Rubashkyn as a woman under the UNHCR refugee system. She became the first gender diverse person recognised as a woman in China or Hong Kong without having undergone a sex reassignment surgery or medical intervention.

In May 2014, New Zealand accepted Rubashkyn as a refugee and granted her asylum, extending a universal recognition of her gender. Her case was the first in the world in which the gender identity of a person was recognised internationally.

A CNN story about her struggle and a short documentary about her life in Hong Kong won a GLAAD Media Award in May 2015.

New Zealand citizenship 

After six years of statelessness in April 2018, the government of New Zealand on behalf of the Ministry of Internal Affairs granted the New Zealand citizenship based on her exceptional and unique circumstances.

Notes

References

1988 births
Living people
Colombian Jews
Colombian non-binary people
Transgender women
Intersex rights in New Zealand
Intersex women
Intersex rights activists
New Zealand activists
New Zealand women activists
New Zealand feminists
New Zealand people of Russian-Jewish descent
New Zealand people of Ukrainian-Jewish descent
New Zealand women chemists
New Zealand women scientists
New Zealand Jews
Stateless people
New Zealand non-binary people
People from Auckland
People from Bogotá
People with acquired New Zealand citizenship
Refugees in New Zealand
Intersex_non-binary_people
Non-binary activists
New Zealand LGBT rights activists
Human rights activists
Women civil rights activists
21st-century Colombian LGBT people
21st-century New Zealand LGBT people